Senator Minor may refer to:

Edward S. Minor (1840–1924), Wisconsin State Senate
William T. Minor (1815–1889), Connecticut State Senate

See also
Senator Miner (disambiguation)